Yevgeni Georgiyevich Skoblikov (born 10 July 1990) is a Russian former professional football player.

Club career
Skoblikov made his Russian Football National League debut for FC Luch-Energiya Vladivostok on 19 July 2014 in a game against PFC Sokol Saratov.

On 9 September 2020, Lori FC announced the signing of Skoblikov to a one-year contract.

References

External links
 
 

1990 births
Living people
Russian footballers
Association football midfielders
FC Luch Vladivostok players
FC Yerevan players
FC Belshina Bobruisk players
FC Lori players
Russian expatriate footballers
Expatriate footballers in Armenia
Expatriate footballers in Belarus
FC Tolyatti players
FC Volga Ulyanovsk players
Sportspeople from Vladivostok